The Royal Canadian Academy of Arts (RCA) is a Canadian arts-related organization that was founded in 1880.

History

1880 to 1890

The title of Royal Canadian Academy of Arts was received from Queen Victoria on 16 July 1880. The Governor General of Canada, John Campbell, Marquess of Lorne, was its first patron. The painter Lucius O’Brien was its first president.

The objects of the Academy as stated in the 1881 publication of the organization's constitution were three-fold:
First - the institution of a National Gallery at the seat of Government;
Second - the holding of Exhibitions in the principal cities of the Dominion;
Third - the establishment of Schools of Art and Design.

In the same publication, two levels of membership were described: Academicians and Associates. No more than forty individuals could be Academicians at one time, while the number of Associates was not limited. All Academicians were required to give an example of their work to the collection of the National Gallery. They were also permitted to show more pieces in Academy-sponsored exhibitions than Associates.

The inaugural exhibition was held in Ottawa and the first Academicians were inducted, including the first woman Academician, Charlotte Schreiber. Through the next 10 years, the Academy held annual exhibitions, often in cooperation with regional artists' societies. Exhibitions in Toronto were a joint project of the Academy and the Ontario Society of Artists, while those held in Montreal were held in partnership with the Montreal Artists Association. Exhibitions were also held in St. John, New Brunswick, and Halifax, Nova Scotia. Additional academicians and associates were added each year until the membership had more than doubled by 1890. Members were drawn from all areas of the country and included anglophones and francophones. Men continued to out-number women and those female members were identified as painters not as designers or architects.

As Academicians joined, they donated an example of their work to the National Gallery of Canada, building the collection of the as-yet unincorporated institution. A temporary home was found for the collection in a building next to the Supreme Court of Canada and the first curator, John W.H. Watts, RCA was appointed to begin organizing exhibitions.

The third objective—to encourage the teaching of art and design in Canada—was found to be more challenging to address with the limited financial resources available to them.

1891 to present
Canadian landscape painter Homer Watson was elected as an associate, became a full member and later became president of the Academy.

The centennial year of the Academy was honoured by a 35 cent, 3 colour postage stamp. The stamp features an image of the original centre block of the Parliament Buildings and the text "Royal Canadian Academy of Arts, 1880–1980", with the name "Thomas Fuller", a member of the Academy and the Dominion Architect of Canada  who had designed the original building.

Members
The Academy is composed of members from across Canada representing over twenty visual arts disciplines. This list is not inclusive. See also :Category:Members of the Royal Canadian Academy of Arts.

1880 to 1890

Academy membership in 1907
Academicians

Associates

Inducted in 1973

 Armand Tatossian, painter

Inducted in 1974
 John Max, photographer

Inducted in 1976

 Richard Gorman, painter
 Ruth Gowdy McKinley, first potter elected to Academy

Inducted in 1991

Inducted in 1999

Inducted in 2002

Inducted in 2004 

 Scott Plear, painting

Inducted in 2006

Inducted in 2007

Inducted in 2008
 Catherine Farish, printmaking
 Susan Collett, ceramics

Inducted in 2009 

 Sara Diamond
 Marius Dubois
 Christian Eckart
 Faye Heavyshield
 Garry Neill Kennedy
Rita McKeough
 Mary Scott
 John Will
 Justin Wonnacott

Inducted in 2010

Inducted in 2011

Inducted in 2012
 Andre Bergeron
 Sandra Bromley
 Tara Bryan
 Ginette Caron
 Sean Caulfield
 Naomi London
 Sarah Maloney
 Jean Pierre Morin
 Nadia Myre
 Anna Torma
 Eva Lapka, ceramics

Inducted in 2013 
 Clarence Dick
 Christos Dikeakos,
 Charles Elliott
 Lynda Gammon
 Rusdi Genest
 Chief Tony Hunt
 David MacWilliam
 Les Manning
 Barbara Paterson
 Susan G. Scott
 Andrew Wright

Inducted in 2014 
Diane Bisson
Marc Boutin
Luben Boykov
Karen Cantine
Donna Clare
Cora Cluett
Gene Dub, architect
Frédéric Metz
Louie Palu, photographer
Claude Provencher
Russell Yuristy

Inducted in 2015 
 Claude Cormier, landscape architecture
 Jacques Fournier, bookbinding
 Libby Hague, printmaking
 Tanya Harnett, interdisciplinary
 Wesley Harris, metalsmithing
 Peter Jacobs, landscape architecture
 Lew Yung-Chien, photography
 Amy Loewan, installation, mixed media
 Rafael Lozano-Hemmer, interdisciplinary
 Marie-Christiane Mathieu, interdisciplinary
 Alexandra McCurdy, ceramics
 Nancy Petry, mixed media
 Alan Stein, book design
 John Taylor, photography

Inducted in 2016 
 Shuvinai Ashoona, drawing
 David Blatherwick, painting
 Ricardo L. Castro, photography, architecture
 Alan R. Collyer, architecture
 Rosalie Favell, photography
 Les Graff, painting
 Andrew Gruft, architecture
 James Hart, sculpture
 Helen Kerr, industrial design
 Alain LeBrun, illustration, graphic design
 Marian Penner Bancroft, photography, video art
 Frank Shebageget, sculpture, installation
 Allyson Simmie, jewellery design
 Brendan Lee Satish Tang, sculpture
 Peter von Tiesenhausen, sculpture, installation
 Ian Wallace, photography, painting
 Elizabeth Zvonar, collage, sculpture

Inducted in 2017 
 Yael Brotman, printmaking
 Diana Dean, painting, sculpture
 Keith L. Graham, architecture
 Barrie Jones, photography
 Royden Mills, sculpture
 Craig Richards, photography
 Jean-Daniel Rohrer, painting
 Marie Saint Pierre, fashion design

Inductees for 2018 
 David T. Alexander, painting
 Noel Best, architecture
 Anne Carrier, architecture
 Pierre Coupey, painting
 Shayne Dark, sculpture
 Lucy Hogg, painting
 Katherine Knight, photography
 Gary Pearson, painting and drawing
 Udo Schliemann, design

Others 
 Rebecca Belmore (1960-), performance and installation work
Sheila Butler
Luc Courchesne ((1952-) (inducted 2010 by way of the RCA Nomination process), interactive art
George Cuthbertson (1929-2017), yacht designer
 Robert Wakeham Pilot
 Leslie Reid (artist) (1947-), inducted 1977, painter and printmaker
John A. Schweitzer (1952-), collagist
Philip Surrey (1910-1990), painter
Campbell Tinning (1910-1996), painter
Gentile Tondino (1923-2001), painter

See also
List of Canadian organizations with royal patronage

References

External links
Royal Canadian Academy of Arts, official site

Canadian art
Organizations based in Canada with royal patronage
Arts organizations based in Canada
Arts organizations established in 1880
1880 establishments in Canada